Dalton Wilkins (born 15 April 1999) is a New Zealand professional footballer who plays as a defender for Kolding IF.

Club career
Wilkins began his career in New Zealand with Auckland City and Eastern Suburbs. In 2019, he moved to Denmark with Helsingør, and then a short loan with Kolding IF in 2019. He transferred permanently to Koling on 25 January 2022.

International career
Wilkins debuted with the New Zealand national team in a 3–1 friendly loss to Jordan on 28 January 2022.

References

External links

1999 births
Living people
New Zealand association footballers
Association football defenders
New Zealand international footballers
New Zealand under-20 international footballers
New Zealand National League players
Danish 1st Division players
Auckland City FC players
FC Helsingør players
Kolding IF players
New Zealand expatriate association footballers
New Zealand expatriate sportspeople in Denmark
Expatriate men's footballers in Denmark